Monocalcium phosphate is an inorganic compound with the chemical formula Ca(H2PO4)2 ("AMCP" or "CMP-A" for anhydrous monocalcium phosphate). It is commonly found as the monohydrate ("MCP" or "MCP-M"), Ca(H2PO4)2·H2O.  Both salts are colourless solids. They are used mainly as superphosphate fertilizers and are also popular leavening agents.

Preparation
Material of relatively high purity, as required for baking, is produced by treating calcium hydroxide with  phosphoric acid:

Samples of Ca(H2PO4)2 tend to convert to dicalcium phosphate:

Applications

Use in fertilizers
Superphosphate fertilizers are produced by treatment of "phosphate rock" with acids ("acidulation").  Using phosphoric acid, fluorapatite is converted to Ca(H2PO4)2:

This solid is called triple superphosphate. Several million tons are produced annually for use as fertilizers. 
Using sulfuric acid, fluorapatite is converted to a mixture of Ca(H2PO4)2 and CaSO4.
This solid is called single superphosphate. 

Residual HF typically reacts with silicate minerals co-mingled with the phosphate ores to produce hexafluorosilicic acid (H2SiF6). The majority of the hexafluorosilicic acid is converted to aluminium fluoride and cryolite for the processing of aluminium. These materials are central to the conversion of aluminium ore into aluminium metal.  

When sulfuric acid is used, the product contains phosphogypsum (CaSO4·2H2O) and is called single superphosphate.

Use as leavening agent
Calcium dihydrogen phosphate is used in the food industry as a leavening agent, i.e., to cause baked goods to rise. Because it is acidic, when combined with an alkali ingredient, commonly sodium bicarbonate (baking soda) or potassium bicarbonate, it reacts to produce carbon dioxide and a salt. Outward pressure of the carbon dioxide gas causes the rising effect. When combined in a ready-made baking powder, the acid and alkali ingredients are included in the right proportions such that they will exactly neutralize each other and not significantly affect the overall pH of the product.  AMCP and MCP are fast acting, releasing most carbon dioxide within minutes of mixing.  It is popularly used in pancake mixes.  In double acting baking powders, MCP is often combined with the slow acting acid sodium acid pyrophosphate (SAPP).

See also
Dicalcium phosphate
Triple superphosphate

References

Further reading
Havlin, J.L., J.D. Beaton, S.L. Tisdale, and W.L. Nelson. 2005. Soil Fertility and Fertilizers. 7th edn. Pearson Prentice Hall, N.J., 

Food additives
Phosphates
Calcium compounds
Acid salts
Inorganic fertilizers
E-number additives